Augusto Morales (born 14 June 1967) is a Chilean table tennis player. He competed at the 1992 Summer Olympics, the 1996 Summer Olympics, and the 2000 Summer Olympics.

References

External links
 

1967 births
Living people
Chilean male table tennis players
Olympic table tennis players of Chile
Table tennis players at the 1992 Summer Olympics
Table tennis players at the 1996 Summer Olympics
Table tennis players at the 2000 Summer Olympics
Place of birth missing (living people)
20th-century Chilean people